Yekkeh Quz may refer to:
 Yekkeh Quz-e Bala
 Yekkeh Quz-e Pain